Lachnea is a genus of fungi belonging to the family Pyronemataceae. The genus was first described in 1822 as Peziza ser. Lachnea by Elias Magnus Fries. This was elevated to genus status by Claude Casimir Gillet in 1880.

The species of this genus are found in Eurasia.

Species

Species:

Lachnea acerina 
Lachnea albobadia 
Lachnea alboflava

References

Pyronemataceae
Taxa named by Elias Magnus Fries
Fungi described in 1822
Pezizales genera